Roberto Cecon (born 28 December 1971) is an Italian former ski jumper.

Career
He won two bronze medals at the FIS Ski Flying World Championships earning them in 1992 and 1994.

Cecon also competed in four Winter Olympics, earning his best finish 16th in the individual large hill event at Lillehammer in 1994. His best finish at the FIS Nordic World Ski Championships was eighth in the individual large hill event at Thunder Bay, Ontario in 1995.

Cecon also earned six World Cup victories in his career between 1990 and 1995. He is now a ski jumping coach.

World Cup

Standings

Wins

References

1971 births
Living people
Italian male ski jumpers
Olympic ski jumpers of Italy
Ski jumpers at the 1992 Winter Olympics
Ski jumpers at the 1994 Winter Olympics
Ski jumpers at the 1998 Winter Olympics
Ski jumpers at the 2002 Winter Olympics
Ski jumping coaches
People from Gemona del Friuli
Ski jumpers of Fiamme Gialle
Sportspeople from Friuli-Venezia Giulia